The 2014 Matsumoto Yamaga FC season sees Matsumoto Yamaga compete in J. League Division 2. Matsumoto Yamaga are also competing in the 2014 Emperor's Cup.

When they made a 2–1 victory at Fukuoka on 1 November 2014, they secured a second place in J2 and promotion to J1 for the first time in their history.

Players

Pre-season Transfers

Mid-season Transfers

Competitions

J. League

League table

Matches

Emperor's Cup

References
2014 J.League Division 2 Fixture

Matsumoto Yamaga FC
Matsumoto Yamaga FC seasons